Sarah Puntigam (born 13 October 1992) is an Austrian professional footballer who plays as a midfielder for Frauen-Bundesliga club 1. FC Köln and the Austria national team.

Club career
On 5 May 2022, Puntigam joined Frauen-Bundesliga club 1. FC Köln on a two-year deal until June 2024.

International career
Puntigam made her international debut on 4 March 2009 in a 2–1 win against Wales. She scored her first two goals with Austria in a 6–0 win against Faroe Islands on 3 March 2010.

On 6 March 2020, Puntigam played her 100th match for Austria in a 1–1 draw against Switzerland. On 17 September 2021, she played her 110th match for Austria and surpassed Nina Burger to become country's all-time most capped player.

Personal life
Puntigam married her girlfriend and Köln teammate Genessee Daughetee in June 2022.

Honours
Bayern Munich
 DFB-Pokal: 2011–12

Austria
 Cyprus Cup: 2016

References

External links

 

1992 births
Living people
Women's association football midfielders
Austrian women's footballers
Austria women's international footballers
Frauen-Bundesliga players
Division 1 Féminine players
FC Bayern Munich (women) players
SC Freiburg (women) players
Montpellier HSC (women) players
Austrian expatriate women's footballers
Austrian expatriate sportspeople in Germany
Austrian expatriate sportspeople in Switzerland
Austrian expatriate sportspeople in France
Expatriate women's footballers in Germany
Expatriate women's footballers in Switzerland
Expatriate women's footballers in France
Austrian LGBT sportspeople
LGBT association football players
Lesbian sportswomen
FIFA Century Club
UEFA Women's Euro 2022 players
UEFA Women's Euro 2017 players